Gili Garabdi - Ancient Secrets of Gypsy Brass is the fourth album released by Romanian twelve-piece Roma brass band Fanfare Ciocărlia. The album was recorded 2005 at both Zece Prăjini, Romania, and Headroom Studio, Berlin, Germany - the latter also being the place the album was mixed. Producers are Henry Ernst and Helmut Neumann. The album was released 2005 by Asphalt Tango Records.

Track listing 
 007 (James Bond Theme) — 3:09
 Alili — 4:16
 Sirba moldoveneasca — 3:36
 Caravan — 4:24
 Ma Maren Ma — 3:52
 Hora arabeasca — 3:56
 Golden Days — 3:57
 Lume, lume — 4:26
 Sandala — 2:58
 Moldavian Mood — 3:27
 Hora evreiasca — 4:22
 Time Out — 0:19
 Godzila — 4:26
 Ibrahim — 4:00
 Rumba de la lasi — 2:46
 Alili (radio version) — 4:03

References

2005 albums
Fanfare Ciocărlia albums
Romani in Romania